The 2009 FIM Speedway World Championship Grand Prix of Slovenia will be the ninth race of the 2009 Speedway Grand Prix season. It took place on 12 September in the Matija Gubec Stadium in Krško, Slovenia.

The Slovenian SGP was won by Emil Sayfutdinov, who beat Rune Holta, Tomasz Gollob and Nicki Pedersen in the final. It was third GP Emil's winning.

Riders 

The Speedway Grand Prix Commission nominated Matej Žagar as the wild card and Izak Šantej and Aleksander Čonda as the track reserves. The riders' starting positions draw for Grand Prix meeting was made on 11 September at 13:00 CEST by Jury President Wolfgang Glas.

Heat details

Heat after heat 
 Crump, Hancock, Harris, Nicholls
 Walasek, Adams, Ułamek, Pedersen
 Gollob, Holta, Andersen, Bjerre
 Sayfutdinov, Lindgren, Jonsson, Žagar
 Sayfutdinov, Crump, Walasek, Andersen
 Žagar, Gollob, Harris, Adams
 Holta, Hancock, Lindgren, Ułamek
 Nicholls, Pedersen, Jonsson, Bjerre
 Adams, Holta, Jonsson, Crump
 Bjerre, Lindgren, Walasek, Harris (F2)
 Pedersen, Žagar, Hancock, Andersen (F3)
 Sayfutdinov, Nicholls, Gollob, Ułamek
 Crump, Bjerre, Ułamek, Žagar
 Sayfutdinov, Holta, Pedersen, Harris
 Hancock, Gollob, Jonsson, Walasek
 Adams, Nicholls, Andersen, Lindgren
 Crump, Pedersen, Lindgren, Gollob
 Andersen, Harris, Jonsson, Ułamek
 Sayfutdinov, Bjerre, Adams, Hancock (F2x)
 Holta, Žagar, Walasek, Nicholls
 Semi-Finals:
 Sayfutdinov, Gollob, Hancock, Adams
 Holta, Pedersen, Crump, Nicholls
 The Final:
 Sayfutdinov (6 points), Holta (4 points), Gollob (2 points), Pedersen (X)

The intermediate classification

See also 
 Speedway Grand Prix
 List of Speedway Grand Prix riders

References

External links 
 FIM-live.com 

Sl
2009
2009 in Slovenian sport